Marvin Levy (born November 16, 1928) is an American publicist, specialized in marketing and public relations. He is most noted for having been a long time marketer for director Steven Spielberg at Amblin Entertainment.

Biography

Early life
Levy graduated from New York University in 1949 and began his career in New York City. Actually entering the advertising sector, he got a job at a radio station, for which he collected questions and answers for a quiz show. Shortly thereafter, he became the publisher of the first Tex McCrary and Jinx Falkenburg talk shows; he was later fired due to cuts, but received a letter of recommendation, successfully completing his work at the New York Metro-Goldwyn-Mayer office in the Advertising and Exploitation Department. He was entrusted with the task of promoting films in New York and conducting promotional campaigns with local stars, including for films awarded with the Best Picture Oscar like Gigi and Ben-Hur.

Moving to Hollywood
In 1962, Levy moved to the public relations company Blowitz, Thomas and Canton, one of the main sales points outside the Hollywood studio system; once BTC disbanded in 1974, Levy moved to the West Coast. Due to a merger with American International Pictures, Levy moved to Columbia Pictures in the first months of 1975. With the commercialization of great films such as Taxi Driver, The Deep and Kramer vs. Kramer, Levy has climbed the hierarchy of the film marketing department of Columbia Pictures. One of the productions he marketed at the time was Close Encounters of the Third Kind, Steven Spielberg's first film after the success of Jaws.

From Amblin to DreamWorks
Spielberg and Levy got along so well that Spielberg increasingly relied on Levy's advice in the following years and Levy became a father figure for him. In 1982, Spielberg was at the zenith in Hollywood and Levy moved to Spielberg's production company Amblin Entertainment to represent it exclusively. He has directed marketing and public relations at Amblin for twelve years. When Spielberg founded DreamWorks Pictures in 1994 with Jeffrey Katzenberg and David Geffen, Levy moved there.

In 1994, Levy received the Les Mason award, the highest award from the Local 600 International Cinematographers Guild (Film Marketer Association).

He has been a member of the Board of Governors of the Academy of Motion Picture Arts and Sciences at the Public Relations Branch from 1991 to 2002 and again since 2004.

In 2018, at the age of 90, he became the first publicist who received an Honorary Academy Award for an exemplary career in publicity that has brought films to the minds, hearts and souls of audiences all over the world.

Partial filmography

 Gigi (1958)
 Ben-Hur (1959)
 Taxi Driver (1976)
 Close Encounters of the Third Kind (1977)
 The Deep (1977)
 Kramer vs. Kramer (1979)
 Back to the Future (1985)
 Back to the Future Part II (1989)
 Back to the Future Part III (1990)
 Jurassic Park (1993)
 Schindler's List (1993)
 The Lost World: Jurassic Park (1996)
 Saving Private Ryan (1998)
 American Beauty (1999)
 Gladiator (2000)
 A Beautiful Mind (2001)
 Munich (2005)
 War Horse (2011)
 Lincoln (2012)
 Bridge of Spies (2015)
 The Post (2017)

References

External links 

 

1928 births
People from New York City
Living people
Academy Honorary Award recipients
New York University alumni